Ilya Aleksandrovich Deriglazov (born 27 November 1983) is a former Russian professional football player.

Club career
He played in the Russian Football National League for FC Lada Togliatti in 2006.

References

External links
 

1983 births
Living people
Russian footballers
Association football defenders
PFC Krylia Sovetov Samara players
FC Lada-Tolyatti players
FC Yenisey Krasnoyarsk players
FC Sakhalin Yuzhno-Sakhalinsk players
FC Volga Ulyanovsk players